Rapolu Ananda Bhaskar (born 15 January 1964) is an Indian journalist turned politician belonging to Telangana Rashtra Samithi. He was elected to the Rajya Sabha from Andhra Pradesh. After Bifurcation of Andhra Pradesh he is allotted to Telangana state by draw of lots.

Early life
He was born in Bombay in the Padmashali community but hails from Kodakandla village in Warangal in Telangana . He has a master's degree in Sociology from Osmania University in 1987.

Career
He worked as a journalist before joining the Congress party in 1994. He worked as a back room manager at Congress party headquarters in AP, Gandhi Bhavan. He was leading the Telangana Congress Monitoring Group for attaining separate statehood for Telangana. He was General Secretary in APCC.

He was elected to the Rajya Sabha in 2012. He was handpicked by the ex-Congress party president, Sonia Gandhi. Later he joined BJP in the presence of BJP national president Amit Shah and Finance Minister Arun Jaitely.

He has resigned from BJP on 26 October 2022 and has joined TRS the same day, in the presence of party's working president KTR.

Personal life
He is married to Saroja and is blessed with a daughter, Priyanka and a son, Adityaram.

References

Indian National Congress politicians

1964 births
People from Hanamkonda district
Living people
Rajya Sabha members from Andhra Pradesh
Rajya Sabha members from Telangana